WWMN (106.3 FM) is a radio station owned by John Yob, through licensee Mitten News LLC. Licensed to Thompsonville, Michigan, the station serves the Traverse City market with a coverage area extending from the tip of the Leelanau Peninsula south to Manistee and Cadillac.

History
WWMN began operations in May 1971 as WKLA-FM and spent much of its programming day simulcasting its AM sister station throughout the 1970s. Around 1980, the station further separated programming from the AM's Middle of the Road format by moving into Adult Contemporary, which has been the station's format since, although the station still simulcast the AM during certain dayparts until 2000.

Synergy Broadcast Media purchased WKLA-FM in 2012 from Lake Michigan Broadcasting. The deal did not close until June 19, 2013, at a price of $580,000 for WKLA-FM and sister stations WKLA and WKZC. Almost immediately, Synergy announced that it was seeking FCC approval to move the areas oldest operating FM station to Thompsonville, Michigan.  (FCC File #BPH-20130801A0K).

The station changed its call sign to the current WWMN on August 15, 2016 with WKLA-FM moving to 96.3 FM and continuing with the Westwood One Hot AC format as "Hits 96" (now "96-3 KLA").

On November 18, 2016, WWMN debuted its new adult album alternative format, branded as "106.3 The Mitten".  The format over time has gravitated towards a Modern AC-leaning presentation with lighter songs from the 70s through the 90s interspersed with upbeat tracks from more contemporary alternative artists.

On April 2, 2018, WWMN changed their format from adult album alternative to a simulcast of news/talk-formatted WJML 1110 AM Petoskey/WJNL 1210 AM Kingsley.

On November 7, 2019, WWMN changed their format from news/talk to adult contemporary, branded as "94.5 & 106.3 North FM".

On June 22, 2020, WWMN changed their format from adult contemporary to a simulcast of album-oriented rock-formatted WQON 100.3 FM Grayling, branded as "Q100".

Previous logo

Sources
Michiguide.com - WWMN History

References

External links

WMN
Radio stations established in 1971
1971 establishments in Michigan
Album-oriented rock radio stations in the United States